In Greek mythology, the Charites (singular Charis) were goddesses.

Charis may also refer to:

 Charis (mythology), one of several Charites, otherwise known as the Three Graces of Greek mythology
 Charis (name)
 Charis, Iran, a village
 Charis Johnson (born 1973), investment executive
 Charis Waddy (1909–2004), Australian-born British author, lecturer and Islamic scholar
 Charis SIL, a typeface
 Eso-Charis, an Arkansas band
 Charis (butterfly), a genus of metalmark butterflies in the tribe Riodinini
 Charis (Safehold), a fictional nation in the Safehold series of books by David Weber
 627 Charis, an asteroid
Grace in Christianity, 'charis' in original Greek